Namatanai Airport  is an airfield serving Namatanai, in the New Ireland Province of Papua New Guinea.

References

External links
 

Defunct airports in Papua New Guinea
Airports in Papua New Guinea
New Ireland Province